Charles Philip Yorke, 5th Earl of Hardwicke,  (23 April 1836 – 18 May 1897), styled Viscount Royston until 1873, and nicknamed Champagne Charlie for his love of the high life, was a British aristocrat, Conservative politician, dandy and bankrupt.

Background
Hardwicke was the eldest son of Admiral Charles Yorke, 4th Earl of Hardwicke, and the Hon. Susan, daughter of Thomas Liddell, 1st Baron Ravensworth. Elliot Yorke was his younger brother.

Cambridge
While studying at Trinity College, Cambridge, Hardwicke played first-class cricket on four occasions for Cambridge University Cricket Club in 1856 and 1857. He was also a Freemason, initiated into Lodge of Himalayan Brotherhood No. 459 and was appointed Provincial Grand Master of Cambridgeshire in 1872.

Political career
Hardwicke was returned to Parliament for Cambridgeshire in 1865 (succeeding his uncle Eliot Yorke) and served under the Earl of Derby and Benjamin Disraeli as Comptroller of the Household between 1866 and 1868. He was sworn of the Privy Council in 1866.

In 1873 he succeeded his father in the earldom and to his estates, including Wimpole Hall in Cambridgeshire, and entered the House of Lords. The following year he was appointed Master of the Buckhounds under Disraeli, and continued in this post until the government fell in 1880.

In 1879 Lord Hardwicke had a horse race, the Hardwicke Stakes, named after him.

An inveterate gambler, the 5th Earl racked up huge debts with the Agar-Robartes Bank and was obliged to put the Wimpole Hall Estate up for sale by auction in 1891. When it failed to raise the reserve price Lord Robartes, as Chairman of Agar-Robartes Bank, accepted the estate in settlement.

Family
Lord Hardwicke married Lady Sophia Georgiana Robertina, daughter of Henry Wellesley, 1st Earl Cowley, in 1863. They had one son and two daughters.

Lady Feodorowna (1864 - 27 June 1934) married Humphrey Sturt, 2nd Baron Alington on 27 June 1934. They had two sons, and three daughters.
Lady Magdalen (1865 - 27 Jan 1940) married Sir Richard Henry Williams-Bulkeley, 12th Baronet on 10 December 1885. They had two sons, and two daughters.
Albert Edward Philip Henry Yorke, 6th Earl of Hardwicke (14 Mar 1867 - 29 Nov 1904)

He died in May 1897, aged 61, and was succeeded in the earldom by his only son, Albert. The Countess of Hardwicke died in June 1923.

References

External links

1836 births
1897 deaths
People educated at Harrow School
Alumni of Trinity College, Cambridge
Deputy Lieutenants of Cambridgeshire
5
Royston, Charles Philip Yorke, Viscount
Members of the Privy Council of the United Kingdom
Royston, Charles Philip Yorke, Viscount
Royston, Charles Philip Yorke, Viscount
UK MPs who inherited peerages
Conservative Party (UK) MPs for English constituencies
Charles
English cricketers
Cambridge University cricketers
Masters of the Buckhounds
Marylebone Cricket Club cricketers
People from Wimpole
British Freemasons
Members of Isaac Newton University Lodge